Block Party!, released on September 7, 2013, is the 2013–2014 robotics competition for FIRST Tech Challenge. In the competition, two alliances, each consisting of two teams, compete to score blocks in plastic crates atop alliance-colored pendulums. Block Party! is the ninth FTC challenge.

Announcement
The contest rules were announced at the headquarters of PTC in Needham, Massachusetts on September 7, 2013. A live audience of about 200 high schoolers and their mentors watched the unveiling by David Price (Regional Director of FIRST), Loretta Bessette (MIT Lincoln Labs and FIRST’s FTC game design team), Don Bossi (President of FIRST), John Stuart (PTC SVP of Global Academic Programs), and Lisa Freed (iRobot STEM Outreach Coordinator). The event was also live streamed.

Alliances
In each match, the four teams competing are organized into red and blue alliances. The members of an alliance compete together to earn points. Alliances are selected randomly prior to the start of each competition.

Field
The field for the competition is a square measuring 12 feet by 12 feet, which can be constructed by teams for practising prior to competitions. In the centre of the field there is a wooden "bridge" with a metal pipe that robots will hang on. On each side of the bridge, there are pendulums with crates. Under the pendulums, there are floor goals that are alliance-specific. On two of the corners, there are flags on PVC poles. In the other two corners, there are trapezoidal areas with plastic cube scoring objects. The field is also divided into two triangular halves, one red and one blue.

Scoring
There are three sections to the game: the Autonomous Period, the Driver-Controlled (or Tele-Operated) Period, and the End Game. The criteria for scoring is different during each segment.

Autonomous Period
In the Autonomous Period, robots run autonomously for thirty seconds. Infrared beacons are placed randomly under a crate on the pendulum prior to the start of the match, but after autonomous programs have been selected. Each robot is allowed to begin with one preloaded block. Unscored blocks are left in the robot after the Autonomous Period ends. An infrared sensor is available to aid in autonomously locating the IR beacon. Robots can also earn points by being either partially or fully on the bridge in the center of the field.

Driver-Controlled Period
During the two-minute Driver-Controlled Period, teams can use standard gamepad controllers, each with two joysticks to operate their robots.

End Game
The final thirty seconds of the Driver-Controlled Period are referred to as the End Game. During End Game, teams are permitted to attempt to score points for special tasks, but these tasks must not begin before the start of End Game.

Advancement Criteria
During tournaments and championships, match wins are not the largest part of the advancement criteria. For example, the winner of the top judged award (the Inspire Award) ranks higher than the winner of the competition-based component (Winning Alliance Captain). Winning lesser judged awards (Think Award, Connect Award, etc.) also plays a part in the advancement order.

For the Block Party challenge, a type of qualifying competition has been introduced in the United States. After qualifying at a regional competition, teams advance to a "Super-Regional", consisting of teams from many different states. There are four regions in the United States, and each region has a "Host Location" where the actual competition will be held.

Notes

2013 in robotics